Hypocoprus is a genus of beetles belonging to the family Cryptophagidae.

The species of this genus are found in Europe and Northern America.

Species:
 Hypocoprus latridioides Motschulsky, 1839
 Hypocoprus tenuis Casey

References

Cryptophagidae